Vat or VAT may refer to:

Container
 Barrel for alcoholic beverage or other liquid

Economics
 Value-added tax, a consumption tax levied on value added
 VAT identification number
 Value Added Tax (United Kingdom)

Places
 Vatican City, ISO country code VAT
 Vát, a village in Hungary

Other uses
 Vat 69, a Scotch blended whisky
 VAT 69 Commando, elite special forces of the Royal Malaysian Police
 Vanajan Autotehdas (VAT), former heavy vehicle producer in Finland
 Veterans Against Terrorism, UK political advocacy group
 Virtual Allocation Table, a component of the Universal Disk Format

See also
 Vats (disambiguation)